Strength of a Woman may refer to:

 Strength of a Woman (album), by Mary J. Blige
 "Strength of a Woman", a 1980 song by Eloise Laws, later covered by The Carpenters
 "The Strength of a Woman", a 1998 song by Phyllis Hyman from her album Forever with You
 "Strength of a Woman", a 2001 song by Geri Halliwell from her album Scream If You Wanna Go Faster
 "Strength of a Woman", a 2002 song by Shaggy from his album Lucky Day